Dheena is an Indian actor, comedian and screenwriter who works prominently in Tamil films. He is known for playing one of the lead roles in the films Thumbaa (2019), Kaithi (2019) and Master (2021)  and as a contestant in the television show Kalakka Povathu Yaaru?.

Career
Dheena was a contestant in the show Kalakka Povathu Yaaru? on Vijay TV. He made his film debut in Dhanush's Pa Paandi essaying the role of Dhanush's friend. In 2019, he made his debut as a lead actor in Thumbaa. In a Times of India review of the film, the reviewer stated that he made "an assured comic performance". In 2019, he played a comedic role in Kaithi. Regarding his role, Janani K of India Today stated that "Dheena’s role brings in a much-needed lightness to the film". He was last seen in the film Master. His next film as a lead actor will be the film Ajith From Aruppukottai. The film is a remake of Kattappanayile Rithwik Roshan and will be produced by Dhanush.

Filmography

Film 
All films are in Tamil, unless otherwise noted.

Television

Awards and nominations

References

External links
 
 Dheena on Moviebuff

Living people
Television personalities from Tamil Nadu
Tamil comedians
Indian male comedians
Tamil male television actors
Male actors in Tamil cinema
Tamil male actors
Indian Tamil people
1990 births